Vaughn Street Park was a baseball park in the northwest United States, located in Portland, Oregon. Opened in 1901, it lasted for over a half century and was torn down in 1956. Its primary tenant was the Portland Beavers of the Pacific Coast League (PCL). During a stretch when the club was tagged as the "Lucky Beavers", the ballpark was also sometimes called Lucky Beavers Stadium.

The site, in the Slabtown area, is presently an industrial property with no traces of the stadium except for a plaque.

History 

Built  in 1901, it was financed by E. I. Fuller and C. F. Swigert, two owners of trolley lines that ran nearby. The ballpark was on a block bounded by Northwest Vaughn Street on the south (third base), Northwest 24th Avenue on the east (first base), and Northwest 25th Avenue on the west (left to center field).

The two financiers hoped to profit from professional baseball, both at the box office and via fares from their trolley lines. In 1896, Portland's former professional baseball team had folded; a new team, the Portland Webfoots, debuted in 1901. This team would go on to win the Pacific Northwest League title that year. The following year, the league merged with the California League to become the Pacific Coast League; the Webfooters, after several name changes, settled on naming the team the Portland Beavers.

Initially, the stadium had a single 3,000-seat grandstand behind home plate; seating was expanded to 6,000 seats in 1905.  That year, Portland hosted the Lewis and Clark Centennial Exposition, and the stadium was used for the National Track and Field championships, held concurrently.  During that event, baseball was temporarily played on the grounds of the Portland Athletic Club (later the Multnomah Athletic Club), on a field that is now the site of Providence Park.  With the construction of additional seating in 1912, Vaughn Street Park's capacity grew to 12,000 spectators.

1920s–30s 

It was expected that the baseball team, now christened the Beavers, would move to the newer stadium, but the team elected to stay at Vaughn Street. Multnomah Stadium was instead used for other sporting events, including college football and greyhound racing.

Vaughn Street Park occasionally hosted other events besides baseball; several prizefights were held there.

Among the notable players to play at Vaughn Street, either for the home team or for the visitors, are Satchel Paige, Joe Tinker, Jim Thorpe, and Ted Williams.

1940s–50s

The stadium also became, however briefly, the home of the Portland Rosebuds, a team owned by Olympic gold medalist  The Rosebuds were part of the West Coast Baseball Association, a Negro league headed by Abe Saperstein, the owner of the Harlem Globetrotters; the league was disbanded after only two months.

In 1947, the center field bleachers burned in an early-morning fire on September 21, blamed on a smoldering  the stadium had recently been condemned by fire  The center field bleachers were rebuilt, smaller than their predecessors and disconnected from the left field bleachers.

In 1955, the stadium was bought by new owners, who later announced that they would tear it down; the Beavers moved to Multnomah Stadium in 1956. The stadium was razed that same year. The grass field from Vaughn Street was transplanted to Multnomah Stadium; thirteen years later in 1969, artificial turf was installed.

Dimensions 
The dimensions were hitter-friendly:

References 
Specific references:

General references:

 Portland Baseball from PDXHistory.com
 Vaughn Street Park – Pacific Coast League from the Portland State History Department, including a 1955 aerial photo (Oregon Historical Society OrHi 5908)

External links

 Oregon Encyclopedia – Vaughn Street Park
 Sanborn map, 1908

Defunct baseball venues in the United States
Defunct college football venues
Minor league baseball venues
Demolished buildings and structures in Portland, Oregon
Demolished sports venues in Oregon
Portland Beavers
Portland Pilots football
American football venues in Oregon
Baseball venues in Oregon
Baseball in Portland, Oregon
Sports venues in Portland, Oregon
1901 establishments in Oregon
Sports venues completed in 1901
1956 disestablishments in Oregon
Sports venues demolished in 1956